Clear-cell adenocarcinoma is a type of adenocarcinoma that shows clear cells.

Types include:
 clear-cell adenocarcinoma of the vagina
 ovarian clear-cell carcinoma
 uterine clear-cell carcinoma
 clear-cell adenocarcinoma of the lung (which is a type of clear-cell carcinoma of the lung).

See also

References

External links 

Carcinoma